The MR-90 was a class of single-level electric multiple unit (EMU) railcars built in 1994-1995 by Bombardier Transportation for the Société de Transport de la Communauté Urbaine de Montreal (STCUM) and now operated by Exo. These cars were ordered when the Deux-Montagnes line was completely rebuilt from 1993 to 1995 and all the equipment and infrastructure was replaced.

With the closure of the Deux-Montagnes line on December 31, 2020 in favor of the Réseau express métropolitain project, the MR-90 fleet was withdrawn from service. They were subsequently transported to Exo's Pointe-Saint-Charles maintenance center where they will be stored. A request for information has been issued to determine the fate of the cars. In 2022, exo announced that the MR-90 coaches would be scrapped. A single married pair, composed of Motor car number 400 and trailer with cab number 485, was set aside for preservation at the Canadian Railway Museum in Saint-Constant.

External links

MR-90 at Mont-Royal Crossing
MR-90 at Mont-Royal Station
High Quality MR-90 departing Sunnybrooke Station
MR-90 departing Canora Station

References

Exo (public transit)
Bombardier Transportation multiple units
Electric multiple units of Canada